Peacock Apartments is a historic apartment building located at Muncie, Delaware County, Indiana. It was built in 1907, and is a three-story, "U"-shaped Classical Revival style brick building with limestone detailing.  It has a low-pitched roof, heavily dentiled cornice, and brick parapet.  The front facade once featured a three-story porch.

It was added to the National Register of Historic Places in 1988.

References

Residential buildings on the National Register of Historic Places in Indiana
Neoclassical architecture in Indiana
Residential buildings completed in 1907
Buildings and structures in Muncie, Indiana
National Register of Historic Places in Muncie, Indiana